Radioulnar ligament can refer to:
 Dorsal radioulnar ligament (ligamentum radioulnare dorsale)
 Palmar radioulnar ligament (ligamentum radioulnare palmare)